Fine Champagne is a cognac blend of eau-de-vie from the Grande Champagne and Petite Champagne crus or growing areas. It is recognized as an appellation of origin related to the six crus of Cognac, but Fine Champagne is not a cru itself. Among the major cognac houses, Rémy Martin is a specialist in this type of production, while other houses such as Braastad, De Luze, Hine and Tiffon all produce and sell Fine Champagne cognacs.

Legal definition and labeling 
According to the Bureau National Interprofessionnel du Cognac (BNIC - National inter-professional cognac office), cognac is the result of blending mature eaux-de-vie from different crus, but this is not mandatory. If a cru is mentioned on the label, this means that 100% of the eaux-de-vie which make up that cognac come from that cru.
The Appellation Cognac Fine Champagne Contrôlée (Cognac Fine Champagne registered designation of origin) is ascribed to cognac of which the eaux-de-vie are exclusive to Grande Champagne and Petite Champagne, with a minimum of 50% Grande Champagne.

Origin and history 

During the 19th century, Charentais geologist Henri Coquand devoted himself to numerous studies on the nature of cognac-producing soil, and his studies resulted in the official delimitation of the different crus. The origin of Cognac Fine Champagne appear to precede Coquand’s research. The name was used by Paul-Emile Rémy Martin, the owner of the Rémy Martin cognac house, who blended the Grande Champagne and Petite Champagne crus. Today, Rémy Martin states 1848 as the birth of their company's first Fine Champagne cognac. A register in their archives proves this name was used from 1820, and the first legal texts protecting the places' names date back to 1824. In 1927, Rémy Martin created VSOP Fine Champagne and since 1948, every cognac from Rémy Martin has the Cognac Fine Champagne designation.

Production and special features 
The Cognac Appellation d'origine contrôlée is divided into six crus corresponding to the growing areas called Grande Champagne, Petite Champagne, Borderies, Fins Bois, Bons Bois and Bois Ordinaires. The crus' delimitation, according to geological and sampling criteria of the eaux-de-vie, was carried out during the 19th century, registered in 1909 and integrated in the designation decree in 1938. Fine Champagne is produced from eaux-de-vie from two crus (Grande Champagne and Petite Champagne), which have very chalky soil. This terroir produces very aromatic eaux-de-vie, slow ripening, with a great ageing potential. Petite Champagne is known for its cognacs' potency, while Grande Champagne is known for its cognacs' finesse. The two main crus' soil, soft and chalky from the Cretaceous period, has a great capacity to retain water, which ensures a regular supply to the vine. The level of organic material is significant and the top soil reflects the light encouraging the vine to thrive. The Fine Champagne cognac's plant material is mostly the Ugni Blanc vine; the cognac designation decree also includes the Folle Blanche and Colombard vines. The Ugni Blanc vine, also called Trebbanio, originates from Italy, it is known for its finesse, vivacity and acidity which is ideal for distillation. A late budding variety, the Ugni Blanc is less susceptible to late frosts. It is also found in Armagnac, the Languedoc, Corsica, Italy and Bulgaria. 
Out of the 75,000 hectares in the Cognac appellation area, Grande Champagne has 13,800 hectares and Petite Champagne has 16,200 hectares. During the 1960s, l'Alliance Fine Champagne (The Fine Champagne Alliance) was started by André Hériard Dubreuil of Rémy Martin. This cooperative brings together a thousand wine growers from Petite Champagne and Grande Champagne.

The Fine Champagne Cognac Houses 
Cognac houses that produce and sell Fine Champagne are:
 A. De Fussigny, Grosperrin 
 Bache
 Braastad
 De Luze
 Grosperrin
 Hine
 Le Roch
 Rémy Martin
 Tiffon

See also 
 Brandy
 Cognac
 Cognac (region)

References 

Cognac
Distilleries in France
French brands
Luxury brands
Charente
Charente-Maritime
French distilled drinks